Hypogymnia vittata is a species of fungus belonging to the family Parmeliaceae.

It has cosmopolitan distribution.

References

vittata